Land of the Bottom Line is the second album by contemporary folk singer-songwriter John Gorka. The album was also Gorka's major label debut for High Street Records/Windham Hill Records. The album was highly acclaimed by critics at the time, and continues to be cited by some as Gorka's finest work. The album's fifteen tracks and near hour-long length also provided an unusually large amount of music for a recording of that era. As Sing Out! editor Mark Moss noted in a review, the topics covered run "the gamut of John's favorite subjects: love, hard luck, local characters, and more."

Track listing

Personnel 
Musicians: (see individual song listings below)

Production:
 Produced – Bill Kollar
 Recorded/Mixed – Bill Kollar at London By Night Productions, Woodbridge, New Jersey
 Assembled – Rhonda Schoen at Sterling Sound, New York City
 Mastered – Ted Jensen at Sterling Sound, New York City, using the AUDIO AUTOMATION MUSE CONSOLE
 Arrangements – Janice Kollar
 Strings and English Horn written and arranged by Bill & Janice Kollar

Artwork:
 Concept and Art Direction – Anne Robinson
 Graphic design – Candace Upman
 Photography – Ann Marsden
 Photo printing – Myrslava Dziuk

Songs 
 "Land of the Bottom Line"
 Gorka first recorded the song for a 1984 issue of Fast Folk Musical Magazine (FF 103, March 1984)
 Musicians:
 John Gorka – vocals, harmony vocals, & acoustic guitar
 Bill Kollar – electric guitar
 Kevin Jenkins – bass
 Marshal Rosenberg – conga
 Janice Kollar – congas, salt shaker, vox voices, & harmony vocals
 Tommy West – harmony vocals

 "Armed with a Broken Heart"

 Musicians:
 John Gorka – vocals, & acoustic guitar
 Vic Colucci – bass
 Michael Blair – Chinese drum
 Claudia Schmidt – harmony vocals
 Barry Mitterhoff – mandolin

 "Raven in the Storm"

 The lyrics to Raven in the storm were co-written with Geoff Bartley. The two artist also collaborate on the song "Mystery to Me" which appeared years later on Gorka's Out of the Valley.
 There have been a number of artists to cover this song:
 Mary Black, on her album, Circus (1995 Grapevine)
 Ten Sugar Coffee on their Addicted (1998 Huge Secret)
 The John Wright Band, on Language of the Heart (2001 Greentrax)
 Musicians:
 John Gorka – vocals, harmony vocals, & acoustic guitar
 Vic Colucci – bass
 Chuck Loeb – electric guitar
 Elliott Randall – electric guitar
 Bill Kollar – electric guitar
 Marshal Rosenberg – bongos
 Janice Kollar – heartbeat, snare, cowbell, & shaker

 "The One That Got Away"

 Musicians:
 John Gorka – vocals & acoustic guitar
 Vic Colucci – bass
 Shawn Colvin – harmony vocals

 "Full of Life"

 Musicians:
 John Gorka – vocals & acoustic guitar
 Vic Colucci – bass
 Janice Kollar – accordion, harmony vocals, & tambourine
 Michael Blair – Uru, clay drum, klangobjete, & shaker
 Claudia Schmidt – harmony vocals
 Joe Ascione – bass drum

 "Stranger in My Driver's Seat"

 Musicians:
 John Gorka – vocals, harmony vocals, & acoustic guitar
 Elliott Randall – electric guitar
 Vic Colucci – bass
 Janice Kollar – bass drum & keyboards
 Michael Blair – spox, crasher

 "The Sentinel"

 Musicians:
 John Gorka – vocals, harmony vocals, & acoustic guitar
 Vic Colucci – bass
 Marsha Heller – English horn

 "Dream Street"

 Musicians:
 John Gorka – vocals, harmony vocals, & acoustic guitar
 Vic Colucci – bass
 Chuck Loeb – electric guitar
 Janice Kollar – bass drum, punching bag, gravel shaker, conga & harmony vocals
 Shawn Colvin – harmony vocals
 Tommy West – harmony vocals

 "Mean Streak"
 Gorka's liner notes read, "'Mean Streak' is dedicated to Cliff Eberhardt and his bad attitude."
 Musicians:
 John Gorka – vocals, harmony vocals, & acoustic guitar
 Kefin Jenkins – bass
 Janice Kollar – bass drum, shotgun, & cowbell
 Bill Kollar – crasher
 Vic Colucci – lead bass

 "Italian Girls"

 Musicians:
 John Gorka – vocals, & acoustic guitar
 Vic Colucci – bass
 Timothy Pitt – acoustic guitar
 Frank Vignola – electric guitar
 Eugene Friesen – cello

 "Jailbirds in the Bighouse"

 Musicians:
 John Gorka – vocals, harmony vocals, & acoustic guitar
 Vic Colucci – bass
 Chuck Loeb – electric guitar
 Janice Kollar – drums, percussion, keyboards, & harmony vocals
 Claudia Schmidt – harmony vocals

 "Promnight in Pigtown"

 Musicians:
 John Gorka – vocals & acoustic guitar
 Vic Colucci – bass
 Barry Mittenhoff – mandolin
 Kenny Cosek – violin
 Michael Blair – marching drum, cymbals, & klangobjekte

 "I Saw a Stranger With Your Hair"
"I Saw a Stranger with Your Hair" is one of two songs that previously appeared on Gorka's debut album for Red House Records, I Know at the request of Will Ackerman.
 Musicians:
 John Gorka – vocals, harmony vocals, & acoustic guitar
 Eugene Friesen – cello
 Kenny Cosek – violin
 Vic Colucci – bass
 Janice Kollar – keyboards & harmony vocals
 Shawn Colvin – harmony vocals
 Tommy West – harmony vocals

 "Love Is Our Cross to Bear"
 This is the other song re-recorded by Gorka that originally appeared on I Know.
 Musicians:
 John Gorka – vocals & acoustic guitar
 Chuck Loeb – electric guitar

 "That's How Legends Are Made"

 Musicians:
 John Gorka – vocals & acoustic guitar
 Vic Colucci – bass
 Timothy Pitt – acoustic guitar
 Barry Mittenhoff – mandolin
 Michael Blair – shaker

References

External links 
 Land of the Bottom Line page at the official John Gorka website (lyrics & audio samples)
 [ Land of the Bottom Line entry] at Allmusic

1990 albums
John Gorka albums
Windham Hill Records albums